Novovoronezh Nuclear Power Plant II (NvNPPII;  []) is a Russian nuclear power plant with two 1200 MW pressurized water reactors (VVER) located in Voronezh Oblast. The power plant is built on the same site as the present Novovoronezh Nuclear Power Plant.

Unit 1 started commercial operation in 2017 and was the first Generation III+ nuclear reactor in the world.
Unit 2 was connected to the grid in 2019.

History
In 2006, the Russian government legislated a nuclear expansion plan for 2007–2015. 
The plan aimed to put two new nuclear reactors into operation each year from 2012. 
This decision provided impetus for the construction of Novovoronezh II, which had been originally been proposed in 1999.

On 20 June 2007 preparations began at the construction site,
and the construction starting ceremony was held on 12 July 2009.

In January 2017 the plant took delivery of a safety instrumentation and control system from Areva NP for installation in its Unit 1.

The first criticality of Unit 2 reactor was achieved on 22 March 2019, with connection to the grid on 1 May 2019.

Description

The power station will comprise two to four VVER-1200/392M reactors of the AES-2006 type. These reactors are the first of their kind. Unit 1 was planned to be added to the grid in 2012, with the second unit to be added a year later. Cost of the project is between 250 billion Rubles. 
The city of Novovoronezh is to provide housing for incoming NvNPP II construction workers. In early 2008 the first two apartment blocks were complete and ready to use.

Construction of the nuclear power plant is important because the existing Novovoronezh nuclear power plant is a focal point of the energy supply system. The power plant complex provides energy not only to Voronezh Oblast but to Belgorod, Lipetsk and Tambov territories as well.

Reactors
The Novovoronezh Nuclear Power Plant II has two units:

Service life of the VVER-1200 is 60 years. With extension of operation for 20 years.

See also

Nuclear power in Russia
List of nuclear reactors#Russia

References

Nuclear power stations in Russia
Buildings and structures in Voronezh Oblast
Buildings and structures completed in 2012
Nuclear power stations using VVER reactors
2012 establishments in Russia
Nuclear power stations with reactors under construction
Nuclear power stations with proposed reactors